The South Side School is a historic school in Sarasota, Florida. It is located at 1901 Webber Street. On September 14, 1984, it was added to the U.S. National Register of Historic Places.

References

External links

 Sarasota County listings at National Register of Historic Places
 Florida's Office of Cultural and Historical Programs
 Sarasota County listings
 Southside Elementary School

Public elementary schools in Florida
National Register of Historic Places in Sarasota County, Florida
Buildings and structures in Sarasota, Florida
School buildings on the National Register of Historic Places in Florida